Joke Man is an album by American comedian, comedy writer and radio personality Jackie Martling.  The album was released on November 5, 1996 on the Oglio Records label.

Track listing
Chubby and Chan
Parrots and Peroxide
Grammies and Goobers
Mammals and Morons
Taxis and O'Tooles
Chimps and Chugs
Mismatches and Memories
Fingers and Floors
Boats and Bowels
Furry Facefulls and the Frugal
Freaks and Families
Plungers and Poets
Smallcox and Sphincters
Bushes and Brides
Marriage Jokes and Other True Stories
Potency and Pigs
Craters and Crappers
Holes, Holes, Holes

Background
In 1979, Martling issued his debut LP, What Did You Expect?  He released two more albums, 1980's Goin' Ape! and 1981's Normal People Are People You Don't Know That Well.  Martling sent all three records to fledgling New York City disk jockey Howard Stern. By 1986, he was a full-time member of Stern's show, later becoming the program's head writer. Martling maintained a steady schedule of live dates while working with Stern, recording Sgt. Pecker, F Jackie, and The Very Best of Jackie Martling's Talking Joke Book Cassettes, Vol. 1.  Joke Man is the second CD from Martling's Stern era.

Description
The Joke Man was recorded in spring and summer of 1993, and released in 1996.  Thomas P. Hegarty and Jim Cooper are credited for Joke Man'''s photography. Joanie Lapallo provided illustrations.

Critical receptionJoke Man'' made its appearance some ten years into Martling's stint as head writer for The Howard Stern Show and offered radio listeners who had not seen the "Joke Man" deliver jokes in person certain access to a seasoned comic performer.  Stephen Thomas Erlewine gives a new listener requisite perspective on the album, suggesting it has its merits:

Jackie Martling is one of the rare dirty comedians who is actually clever and genuinely funny. Naturally, he's best heard on the Howard Stern Show, where he supplies Howard with jokes during the course of the morning-long radio show. The Joke Man, Martling's first album, isn't quite as uproariously funny as the Stern show, but it's still a lot better than most dirty joke records, offering definitive proof that Martling is both foul and funny.

References

 

1996 albums
Jackie Martling albums
1990s comedy albums
Oglio Records albums